St Roch may refer to:

Saint Roch (traditionally c.1295 – 16 August 1327)
St. Roch (ship), a Royal Canadian Mounted Police exploration vessel
St. Roch, New Orleans, a section of the city of New Orleans, Louisiana
 St. Roch's Secondary School, a Roman Catholic secondary school in Glasgow
 St Roch's F.C., a Scottish football club in Glasgow